Count Adolf III of Nassau-Wiesbaden-Idstein (by a different way of counting: Adolf IV; 10 November 1443 – 6 July 1511) was a son of Count John II of Nassau-Wiesbaden-Idstein and his wife Mary of Nassau-Siegen (1418–1472).  After his father's death in 1480, he ruled Nassau-Wiesbaden and his brother Philip ruled Nassau-Idstein.  After Philip's childless death in 1509, Adolf III ruled also ruled Nassau-Idstein.

Adolf served in the army of the Habsburg Duke consort and later Emperor Maximilian I and participated in the conquest of the Duchy of Gelre in 1478.  In 1481, he was appointed stadtholder of the County of Zutphen and in 1489 also as stadtholder of Gelre.  However, in 1492 Charles II was reinstated as Duke of Guelders.  Adolf then returned to Germany

Marriage and issue 
He married in 1484 to Margarethe von Hanau-Lichtenberg, a daughter of Philip I of Hanau-Lichtenberg.   Their children were:
 Maria Margaret (1487–1548), married in 1502 to Louis I, Count of Nassau-Weilburg,
 Anna (1488–1550), married in 1506 to Henry XXXI of Schwarzburg-Sondershausen,
 Philip I (1490–1558), who succeeded him.

Ancestry

Footnotes 

House of Nassau
Counts of Nassau
1443 births
1511 deaths
15th-century German people